The Smith & Wesson Model 41 is a semi-automatic pistol developed by Smith & Wesson after World War II as a competitive target pistol. It was designed with a 105 degree grip angle, the same as the Colt M1911 pistol, to maintain a consistent grip angle.

Production history
In July 1947, two prototypes—numbered X-41 and X-42—were produced, tested, and improved for the next 10 years.  In 1957, the Model 41 was made available to the public for sale when Smith & Wesson produced 679 units.  At the end of 1958, they had built 9,875 Model 41 pistols. A lighter  barrel was offered in 1958 for field use. The Model 41-1 was introduced in 1960 and was chambered in .22 Short for International Rapid Fire competition. Only 1000 were made using light aluminum slides necessary for function with the lower powered .22 Short.

In August 1963, the 5-inch heavy barrel version came into the market. Stoeger's Shooter's Bible of 1964 shows a 
 barrel grooved for Olympic center weights. The cocking indicator and -inch barrel were dropped in 1978.  The  barrel was introduced in 1978 with no provision for a muzzle brake. A  barrel was offered for a few months in 1991. In 1992, the Model 41 was dropped from production. In 1994, Smith & Wesson returned it to production as the Model 41 (New Model).

Model 46
In 1957, Smith & Wesson offered a "no frills" version of the Model 41, designated the Model 46. In 1959, it was selected by the U.S. Air Force for basic marksmanship training. About 4000 units were made in total: 2500 with a  barrel, 1000 with  barrels, and 500 with  barrels. The pistol lacked the checkering, polished blue finish, and other refinements of the Model 41. It proved to be a commercial failure with consumers who preferred the more costly Model 41, and production ceased in 1966.

References

Smith & Wesson semi-automatic pistols
.22 LR pistols